Marcin Jagoda (born December 28, 1980, in Tarzana, California) is a male beach volleyball player from the United States who participated at the NORCECA Circuit 2009 at Manzanillo playing with Seth Burnham. They finished in the 9th position.

References

External links

 
 Marcin Jagoda profile at AVP 
 
 Marcin Jagoda volleyball videos at Volleyball 1on1

1980 births
Living people
American men's beach volleyball players
People from Tarzana, Los Angeles